is a private junior college in Nakatsu, Ōita, Japan. The predecessor of the school, founded in 1899, was chartered as a women's junior college in 1967. In 2000 it became coeducational, while the present name was adopted in 2002.

External links
 Official website 

Educational institutions established in 1899
Private universities and colleges in Japan
Universities and colleges in Ōita Prefecture
Japanese junior colleges
1899 establishments in Japan